Ghana made its Paralympic Games début at the 2004 Summer Paralympics in Athens, sending three representatives to compete in two sports. Nkegbe Botsyo, in athletics, took part in the men's 100m, 200m and 400m, in the T54 category. Ajara Mohammed entered the women's 800m and the marathon, also in the T54 category. Alfred Adjetey Sowah competed in powerlifting, in the men's up to 52 kg.

Botsyo and Mohammed returned to compete again in the 2008 Summer Paralympics in Beijing, the former in the men's 100m and 200m (T54), and the latter in the women's 200m and 1,500m (T54).

No Ghanaian has ever won a medal at the Paralympic Games,

Ghana took part in the 2012 Summer Paralympics, and the National Paralympic Committee of Ghana chose Bedford as the UK training base for its Paralympians.

Medals

Medals by Summer Games

Medals by Winter Games

See also
 Ghana at the Olympics

References